The Stylocellidae are a family of harvestmen with about 30 described species, all of which occur from India to New Guinea. Members of this family are from one to seven millimeters long. While Stylocellus species have eyes, these are absent in the other two genera.

Name
The name of the type genus is combined from Ancient Greek stylos "pillar" and Latin ocellus "eye", referring to the elongated shape of the animal, compared to Sironidae, and the presence of eyes.

Species
 Fangensis Rambla, 1994 — Thailand
 Fangensis cavernarus Schwendinger & Giribet, 2005
 Fangensis insulanus Schwendinger & Giribet, 2005
 Fangensis leclerci Rambla, 1994
 Fangensis spelaeus Schwendinger & Giribet, 2005

 Leptopsalis Thorell, 1882 - Sumatra
 Leptopsalis beccarii Thorell, 1882

 Meghalaya Giribet, Sharma & Bastawade, 2007 — India
 Meghalaya annandalei Giribet, Sharma & Bastawade, 2007

 Miopsalis Thorell, 1890 — Pulu-Pinang, Malaysia
 Miopsalis pulicaria Thorell, 1890

 Stylocellus Westwood, 1874
Stylocellus collinsi Shear, 1993 — Malaysia
Stylocellus dumoga Shear, 1993 — Indonesia
Stylocellus globosus Schwendinger & Giribet, 2004 — Malaysia
Stylocellus gryllospecus Shear, 1993 — Malaysia
Stylocellus hillyardi Shear, 1993 — Indonesia
Stylocellus javanus (Thorell, 1882) — Java
Stylocellus kinabalu Shear, 1993 — Malaysia
Stylocellus laevichelis Roewer, 1946 — Malaysia
Stylocellus leakeyi Shear, 1993 — Malaysia
Stylocellus lionotus Pocock, 1897 — Borneo
Stylocellus lydekkeri Clouse & Giribet, 2007 — Indonesia
Stylocellus modestus Hansen & Sørensen, 1904 — Celebes
Stylocellus mulu Shear, 1993 — Malaysia
Stylocellus novaguineae Clouse & Giribet, 2007 — Indonesia
Stylocellus pangrango Shear, 1993 — Indonesia
Stylocellus pocockii Hansen & Sørensen, 1904 — North Borneo
Stylocellus ramblae Giribet, 2002 — Singapore
Stylocellus sabah Shear, 1993 — Malaysia
Stylocellus sedgwicki Shear, 1979 — Malaysia
Stylocellus silhavyi Rambla, 1991 — Malaysia
Stylocellus spinifrons Roewer, 1946 — Malaysia: Sarawak
Stylocellus sulcatus Hansen & Sørensen, 1904 — Java
Stylocellus sumatranus Westwood, 1874 — Sumatra
Stylocellus tambusisi Shear, 1993 — Indonesia
Stylocellus tarumpitao Shear, 1993 — Philippines
Stylocellus thorellii Hansen & Sørensen, 1904 — Sumatra
Stylocellus weberii Hansen & Sørensen, 1904 — Sumatra
 †Palaeosiro Poinar 2008
 †Palaeosiro burmanicum Poinar 2008 Burmese amber, Myanmar, Cenomanian

Footnotes

References
 Joel Hallan's Biology Catalog: Stylocellidae
 Checklist of the Cyphophthalmi species of the World
  (eds.) (2007): Harvestmen - The Biology of Opiliones. Harvard University Press

Further reading
  (2005): The systematics of the south-east Asian genus Fangensis Rambla, 1994 (Opiliones, Cyphophthalmi: Stylocellidae). Invertebrate Systematics 19: 297-323.

Harvestmen
Harvestman families